Mehdi Abdi Ghara (born 30 November 1998) is an Iranian professional footballer who plays as a forward for Persian Gulf Pro League club Persepolis.

Personal life 
Mehdi Abdi was born on 30 November 1998 in Qara Kheyl, Qaem Shahr County, Mazandaran Province.

Club career

Persepolis 

He scored his first and second goals in the game between Persepolis and Peykan in the 22nd week of the Pro League. He scored his third goal in the game against Naft Masjed Soleyman in the 26th week of the 19th league, in which Persepolis won the fastest championship in the Pro League. In the AFC Champions League semi-finals, AFC unexpectedly banned Issa Alekasir from all sporting activities. According to Yahya Golmohammadi's decision to include Mehdi Abdi in the AFC Champions League semi-final match against Al-Nassr, he placed Mehdi Abdi in the starting lineup and he opened the gate of Al-Nassr with a header, causing Persepolis to reach the AFC Champions League final.

In the 2018 season, he became the top scorer of the Tehran Youths Competition with 24 goals. He also has 14 assists in his record. He scored the first goal of the match against Ulsan Hyundai FC in the 2020 AFC Champions League Final.

Career statistics

Honours
Persepolis
Persian Gulf Pro League (2): 2019–20, 2020–21
Iranian Super Cup (1): 2020 ; Runner-up (1): 2021
AFC Champions League Runner-up (1): 2020

References

External links

Mehdi Abdi at Persian League

Mehdi Abdi at eurosport

1998 births
Living people
People from Qaem Shahr
Iranian footballers
Association football forwards
Persepolis F.C. players
Azadegan League players
Persian Gulf Pro League players
Sportspeople from Mazandaran province